Tommerup Stationsby is a town on the island of Funen, Denmark with a population of 2,482 (January 2022).

Most villagers work in the more urbanised areas, but cattle are also kept and Tommerup is home to a stone factory. Because of clay shortages, this factory is mainly used for special ceramic products, such as a vase, five metres high, which was exhibited at the World's Fair in Sevilla, in 1992.

In 1996, Tommerup Stationsby declared itself Cultural Village of Europe. In 1999, it became part of the European network of villages known as Cultural Villages of Europe.

There is a train station in Tommerup, run by DSB, with departures once an hour for Fredericia, where you can continue to cities such as Aalborg and Aarhus.

There is also a departure every hour the other way to the third biggest city in Denmark, Odense, where there are departures for the capital, Copenhagen.

References

Cities and towns in the Region of Southern Denmark
Populated places in Funen
Assens Municipality